Solomon (Shlomo ) is a figure identified in the Old Testament (Hebrew Bible) as the king of Israel, and the son of King David.

Solomon may also refer to:

Music
Solomon (Boyce), a 1742 serenata by Boyce
Solomon (Handel), a 1748 oratorio by Handel
Solomon (band), a New Zealand rock band formed in 2004
Solomon (album), a 2017 album by Welsh band Calan

Film 
 The Kingdom of Solomon, Iranian movie
 Solomon (film), a 1997 Biblical film

Places
Solomon, Alaska, an unincorporated community
Solomon, Kansas, United States
Solomons, Maryland, United States
Solomontown, South Australia, a suburb of Port Pirie
Solomon, a village in Gârbou Commune, Sălaj County, Romania
Solomon Creek, a creek in Pennsylvania
Solomon Islands, a nation state in the Pacific
Solomon Lake, a lake in Minnesota, United States
Solomon River, Kansas, United States
Division of Solomon, an Australian electoral division

Other
 Solomon (magister militum), Byzantine general in the Vandalic War (533–534)
 Solomon (name), a list of people with the given name or surname
 Solomon Airlines, a national airline of the Solomon Islands
 Solomon, a size of wine bottle
 Solomon Accounting software a.k.a. Microsoft Dynamics SL
 Operation Solomon, a 1991 Jewish evacuation mission from Ethiopia

See also
 Solomon Grundy (disambiguation)
 
 Salomon (disambiguation)
 Salamon (disambiguation)
 Salman (disambiguation)
 Salomo (disambiguation)
 Salomon (disambiguation)
 Shalom (disambiguation)
 Soleyman (disambiguation)
 Soliman (disambiguation)
 Soloman (disambiguation)
 Solomons (disambiguation)
 Sulaiman (disambiguation)
 Suleiman
 Suleman (disambiguation)
 Zalman (name)

Jewish surnames
Yiddish-language surnames
Sephardic surnames
Jewish masculine given names